Valletta F.C. is a  professional football club based in Valletta, the capital city of Malta, and competes in the Maltese Premier League, the top flight of Maltese football. The club was founded in 1943 after a merge of Valletta Prestons, Valletta St. Paul's and Valletta United, the latter being a two-time league winner before the Second World War.

Considered one of the most supported and successful clubs in Maltese football, the club has won 25 league titles, 14 FA Trophies and a record 13 Super Cups.

History 

There is no clear evidence on when Valletta F.C. started, hence the fact that Valletta possessed two clubs at that era. The foundation of Valletta F.C. was laid with the creation of the Valletta United team. Valletta United was known as the "team of the square" since the club was located in St. George's Square. Valletta United represented the city from 1904 to 1932.

The city of Valletta in Malta has a long footballing history, between 1886 and 1919 at some point or another, around fourteen teams had competed representing the city. Amongst these early teams included the popular Boys Empire League, Valletta College, St. George's Square, Dockyard Albion and Malta Athletic Club.

An early step in the history of the current club was the founding of Valletta United Football Club in 1903 by local youngsters. Despite their enthusiasm for the game which had been brought to the island by the British, the youngsters had a rough start with limited supplies. They cut their white trousers into long shorts and dyed their shirts into that of the club colours (brown, with yellow sleeves) for their uniforms.

The Ditch at Porte des Bombes, which itself had been the scene of the first ever recorded Maltese football match in 1886, was chosen to host Valletta United's first match on 9 January 1904. United faced off against a team from the Collegiate School and won 1–0 with a strike from a forward named L. Agius. The full Valletta United team that day included;

The club soon found a more permanent home at St. George's Square, just opposite the Grandmaster's Palace in Valletta; they gained the nickname "the team of the square" because of this. Valletta first gained silverware during the 1914–15 season, when they won both the Cousis Shield and the Maltese League championship, it was only the fifth season the league had been competed in Malta.

Much of Maltese football was dominated by Floriana and Sliema Wanderers up until the Second World War, Valletta attempted to upset the status quo several times; they won the Cousis Shield for the second time in 1920–21 and finished as runners-up in the Maltese League during both 1925–26 and 1926–27. During their last season, Valletta United upset the two main clubs in Malta of the time, by winning the Maltese League in 1931–32, however they did not enter the following season.

Although Sliema and Floriana dominated the local scene in those times, by winning these trophies it was Valletta United that started to break into this monopoly and induce greater competition. Valletta United were very active in the Championship of the first division and in fact played 97 games.

During the period that Valletta United played within the Malta Football Association (i.e., from 1909 to 1932), Valletta United won the championship in 1931–32. However, for some reason in the following season, Valletta United disappeared from the football scene and thus the monopoly of Sliema and Floriana football clubs recommenced.

Valletta United was not the only team from the city that played in the highest Division of the M.F.A. In the 1925–26 and the 1926–27 seasons there were Valletta Rovers who played in the highest Division of the M.F.A., then in the season 1937–38 and 1938–39 there was Valletta City.

The winning of five cups in one season
In 1996–97 Valletta F.C. won all five competitions that the Maltese football offers. This was done by succeeding to win the Premier League, Rothmans Trophy, Super Five Cup, Lowenbrau Cup and Super Cup.

The historic season – 2000–01 – Six cups in one season
In the season 2000–01, Valletta F.C. succeeded in breaking their own record from 1996 to 1997. This time they won the six competitions offered by the M.F.A. This particular season there was an additional one, namely the Centenary Cup. It had been added to celebrate the 100th Anniversary of the M.F.A.

2007–08: Champions again
Hope for their first trophy in seven years was a huge thought running through Valletta fans in the summer of 2007. Valletta spent a lot of money in the transfer market and expectations were high. Valletta began the season in the worst possible fashion, with a 3–2 defeat to Eternal rivals, Floriana. Valletta's poor start continued with a 1–1 draw against Hibernians, defeat to Sliema, a 0–0 draw with Hamrun Spartans and Msida respectively. However, eventually Valletta hit good form with a 1–0 win over Birkirkara, a 7–0 trashing over champions Marsaxlokk and they gained revenge over Floriana with a 4–0 win on 8 December. After wins over Msida, Mqabba, Hamrun, Sliema and Marsaxlokk the club showed its winning pedigree. Valletta headed to the final round of the season on a high note.

Valletta won their 19th Premier League title after Marsaxlokk failed to beat Birkirkara on Saturday 3 May after a very successful Championship Pool campaign. However, with the title in the bag the long unbeaten streak soon came to an end, and the season ended with a number of defeats. The team also failed to reach the U*Bet F.A. Trophy 2008 final, after losing 4–2 to rivals Birkirkara in the semi-final. But except for the early stages and the post-championship games, Valletta had been the most consistent side.

20th Title
Valletta won the 2010–11 BOV Premier League as an unbeaten team which brought the 20th title to Valletta FC's history.

21st Title (3/4 cups)
Valletta won The 2011–12 BOV Premier League with two matches still to go after beating Sliema Wanderers 3–0, this was the 21st title in the history of Valletta.

They won three cups out of four cups in the domestic league:
The 2011–12 BOV Premier League,
The 2011–12 Maltese Super Cup,
and the Euro Challenge Cup.

Players

Current squad

Out on loan

Retired numbers
 7 –  Gilbert Agius, MF, 1990–2012

Personnel

Coaching staff

Managerial history

European record 

Legend: GF = Goals For. GA = Goals Against. GD = Goal Difference.

Honours

Notes

References

External links 

 
 Valletta F.C. at UEFA

 
Football clubs in Malta
Football clubs in Valletta
Association football clubs established in 1943
1943 establishments in Malta